Kyla Reid ( Smith; born 22 September 1983) is a British house music singer in the UK funky subgenre. She is best known for the song "Do You Mind" which was later sampled on Drake's 2016 international hit "One Dance".

Career
Kyla featured on the Crazy Cousinz UK funky song "Do You Mind", released in 2008, which peaked at number 48 on the UK Singles Chart in 2009. DJ Paleface liked Kyla's voice after seeing her in a video for the song "Be What I Wanna Be".

In early 2016, Kyla was first contacted by Drake's production team regarding the use of her 2008 song "Do You Mind" in a new afrobeats and dancehall-infused song with Drake and Nigerian artist Wizkid. The song, "One Dance", was quickly produced and released in early April 2016, due to fear of it being leaked, and became an international hit, reaching number 1 in the singles chart in 15 different countries, including her native UK, the US and Drake's native Canada.

The success of "One Dance" allowed Kyla to reboot her career, with guest appearances in a number of 2016 British summer music festivals, including the Wireless Festival. Kyla was later featured on English producer Naughty Boy's single, "Should've Been Me", which was released in November 2016 and peaked at number 61 on the UK Singles Chart.  She was later featured on another single by producer Zac Samuel, "Play It Cool".

Kyla released her first single as a lead artist, called "You Ain't Mine", featuring dancehall artist Popcaan, on 15 September 2017.

Personal life
Kyla is married to Errol Reid (also known as DJ Paleface, one half of the Crazy Cousinz production team) and has a son. Kyla gave up her music career to start a family. She was previously an ESL teacher.

References

British house musicians
Living people
1983 births
21st-century British women singers
UK funky